Zhang Ji (died 196) was a military general serving under the warlord Dong Zhuo during the late Eastern Han dynasty of China.

Life
Zhang Ji was from Zuli County, Wuwei Commandery, which is in present-day Jingyuan County, Gansu. He started his career as a subordinate of Niu Fu, a son-in-law of the warlord Dong Zhuo, who controlled the Han central government and the figurehead Emperor Xian from 189 to 192. In 192, Niu Fu ordered Zhang Ji to join Li Jue and Guo Si in leading troops to attack the general Zhu Jun at Zhongmu County and pillage Chenliu and Yingchuan commanderies.

After Dong Zhuo was assassinated in Chang'an in 192, Li Jue, Guo Si, Zhang Ji and other former followers of Dong Zhuo requested amnesty from Wang Yun, who replaced Dong Zhuo as the new head of the central government. However, Wang Yun refused and wanted to have all of them executed. Heeding Jia Xu's advice, Li Jue, Guo Si, Zhang Ji and Dong Zhuo's former followers led their troops to attack Chang'an and succeeded in driving away Lü Bu and seizing control of the central government. Zhang Ji was then appointed as General Who Guards the East and ordered to station at a military garrison in Hongnong Commandery. He was also enfeoffed as the Marquis of Pingyang.

In 195, when internal conflict broke out between Li Jue and Guo Si in Chang'an, Zhang Ji succeeded in mediating the conflict and persuading both sides to make peace. Zhang Ji also suggested letting Emperor Xian leave Chang'an and return to the old imperial capital, Luoyang. Emperor Xian then promoted Zhang Ji to General of Agile Cavalry. However, Zhang Ji later had disagreements with the generals Yang Feng and Dong Cheng, who were escorting Emperor Xian back to Luoyang, so he allied with Li Jue and Guo Si to attack Yang Feng and Dong Cheng in an attempt to capture Emperor Xian and bring him back to Chang'an. However, the emperor had already escaped and taken shelter under the warlord Zhang Yang.

In 196, Zhang Ji led his troops out of the Guanzhong region and moved to Nanyang Commandery in northern Jing Province. He then attempted to conquer Rang County (穰縣; present-day Dengzhou, Henan), but was killed by a stray arrow in the midst of battle.

Zhang Ji's nephew, Zhang Xiu, made peace with Liu Biao, the Governor of Jing Province, who allowed him to stay at Wan County (宛縣; or Wancheng 宛城; present-day Wancheng District, Nanyang, Henan). Zhang Xiu became a minor warlord in his own right. Zhang Ji's widow, who is called Lady Zou in the 14th-century historical novel Romance of the Three Kingdoms, was taken by the warlord Cao Cao as a concubine.

See also
 Lists of people of the Three Kingdoms

References

 Chen, Shou (3rd century). Records of the Three Kingdoms (Sanguozhi).
 Fan, Ye (5th century). Book of the Later Han (Houhanshu).
 Pei, Songzhi (5th century). Annotations to Records of the Three Kingdoms (Sanguozhi zhu).

2nd-century births
196 deaths
Dong Zhuo and associates
Han dynasty generals from Gansu
People from Baiyin
Han dynasty people killed in battle